Pascha  (or other similar spellings) may refer to:
Passover, the Aramaic spelling of the Hebrew word Pesach
Pesach seder, the festive meal beginning the 14th and ending on the 15th of Nisan
Easter, central religious feast in the Christian liturgical year
Paskha, an Easter dish served in several Slavic countries
Paska (bread), an Easter bread served in Ukraine
Christian observance of Passover, a holiday celebrated by a small number of Christians
German spelling of Pasha
Pascha (brothel), a large brothel in Cologne, Germany
Edmund Pascha (1714–1772), preacher, organist, and composer

See also
Pasch (surname)
Paschal (disambiguation)
Pascal (disambiguation)
Pasha (disambiguation)